Carine Panda Masungula (born 22 February 1990), known as Carine Panda, is a DR Congolese footballer who plays as a midfielder. She has been a member of the DR Congo women's national team.

Club career
Panda has played for Force Terrestre in the Democratic Republic of the Congo.

International career
Panda was capped for the DR Congo at senior level during the 2006 African Women's Championship qualification.

International goals
Scores and results list DR Congo's goal tally first

See also
 List of Democratic Republic of the Congo women's international footballers

References

1990 births
Living people
Democratic Republic of the Congo women's footballers
Women's association football midfielders
Democratic Republic of the Congo women's international footballers
21st-century Democratic Republic of the Congo people